Andrew Aird High (November 21, 1897 – February 18, 1981) was an American professional baseball third baseman, scout and coach. He played in Major League Baseball (MLB) for the Brooklyn Robins, Boston Braves, St. Louis Cardinals, Cincinnati Reds and Philadelphia Phillies between 1922 and 1934.

He batted left-handed and threw right-handed. His brothers Hugh and Charlie also played in the major leagues.

Career
High appeared in 1,314 games played in the major leagues and made 1,250 hits, including 195 doubles, 65 triples and 44 home runs. In his best season,  with Brooklyn, High collected 191 hits and batted .328. 

In 34 World Series at bats, High collected ten hits, batting .294. In the decisive Game 7 of the 1931 World Series, High, batting leadoff, had three hits in four at bats and ignited a pair of two-run rallies, scoring twice and helping the Redbirds build a 4–0 lead; their foes, the defending world champion Philadelphia Athletics, could not recover, and St. Louis won the world title.

Later life
High was a player/manager in the minor leagues from 1934 to 1936.  He coached for the Brooklyn Dodgers in 1937–38 and then became a scout and, eventually, director of scouting for the Dodgers until his retirement in 1963. During his quarter-century scouting career, the Dodgers won nine NL pennants in Brooklyn and Los Angeles, and three World Series titles.

High died in 1981 at a  healthcare facility in Sylvania, Ohio. He was buried at a cemetery in Webster Groves, Missouri.

References

External links

Andy High at SABR (Baseball BioProject)

1897 births
1981 deaths
Baseball players from Illinois
Boston Braves players
Brooklyn Robins players
Brooklyn Dodgers coaches
Brooklyn Dodgers scouts
Cincinnati Reds players
Columbus Red Birds players
Cordele Reds players
Hazleton Mountaineers players
Los Angeles Dodgers scouts
Major League Baseball scouting directors
Major League Baseball third basemen
Memphis Chickasaws players
People from Jackson County, Illinois
Philadelphia Phillies players
St. Louis Cardinals players
Syracuse Chiefs managers
Syracuse Chiefs players